Eden Township is one of eleven townships in LaGrange County, Indiana. As of the 2020 census, its population was 4,894, up from 4,231 at the 2010 census, when it also contained 1,085 housing units. The township has a large Amish and Mennonite population.

According to the 2019 "ACS 5-Year Estimates Data Profiles", 18% of the township's population spoke only English, while 79 spoke an "other [than Spanish] Indo-European language" (basically Pennsylvania German/German).

Eden Township was organized in 1832.

Geography

Demographics

References

External links
 Indiana Township Association
 United Township Association of Indiana

Townships in LaGrange County, Indiana
Townships in Indiana